Jabot Airport, also known as Jabat Airport, is a public-use airport on Jabot Island, Marshall Islands. This airport is assigned the location identifier JAT by the IATA.

Airlines and destinations

References

Airports in the Marshall Islands